"Something Like That" is a song written by Rick Ferrell and Keith Follesé and recorded by American country music artist Tim McGraw.  It was released in June 1999 as the second single from McGraw's album A Place in the Sun.  The song reached number one on the US Billboard Hot Country Singles & Tracks (now Hot Country Songs) chart, and peaked at number 28 on the Billboard Hot 100, making it a minor crossover hit.

Background
"Something Like That" shares songwriting credits between Rick Ferrell and Keith Follesé, two Nashville lyricists. Ferrell first developed the song based on his memories of going to the local county fair in his youth in Ohio. He worked on the song for some time, stumbling upon its central piano melody, before joining forces with Follesé, who added details. An original demo of the song was included on the 2010 compilation The Original Songwriter Demos Volumes 1 & 2.

The song recounts the narrator's youthful experience of falling in love for the very first time at age seventeen. The man sees a woman at a county fair on Labor Day weekend when he is seventeen, and then five years later, sees her on a plane, while the man is heading to Mardi Gras. The bridge talks about how a love can never go away no matter how long the two people are apart. The song has been known as the "BBQ Stain Song" due to its memorable chorus hook: "I had a barbecue stain on my white t-shirt".

Commercial performance
According to Ferrell, the song was not initially slated to be a single. He stated in an interview that McGraw was adamant to his label, Curb Records, to issue the song: "Tim kind of forced their hand on it," he said. Curb first serviced the song to radio in May 1999. According to Nielsen BDS, the song was the top-played radio single in any musical genre in the 2000s with 487,343 spins from January 1, 2000, to December 17, 2009.

Critical reception
Natalie Nichols, writing for the Los Angeles Times, called it "a breezy recollection of young love" with "clever turns of phrase." Ed Masley of The Arizona Republic called the song "feel-good" and reminiscent of the work of Tom Petty. Kevin John Coyne of Country Universe gave the song an A grade, saying that "through its vivid, detail-laden approach, the lyric effectively hones [sic] in on the fact that the experience of one's first love is, in itself, unforgettable." He also states that the point of the song "is driven home by a sprightly piano hook, toe-tapping rhythm, and wildly catchy singalong-friendly chorus – a one-two punch that helps the record make an impression both as a great lyric and as a fun, catchy listen."

Music video
The music video was directed by Scott Scovill, and produced by Moo TV. It premiered on CMT on July 2, 1999, during The CMT Delivery Room. It features McGraw on his touring.

Other versions
In September 2020, McGraw released a stripped-down acoustic version of the song. McGraw also revealed, around the time of the release of this version, that it is one of his favorite songs to play live. He also performed this rendition live on the CBS special United We Sing: A Grammy Salute to the Unsung Heroes. The next year, the song was covered by singer-songwriter Alex Melton in a pop punk style, featuring vocals from Ryan Scott Graham of the band State Champs.

Charts
"Something Like That" re-entered the U.S. Billboard Hot Country Singles & Tracks as an official single at number 68  for the week of July 3, 1999.

Year-end charts

Certifications

References

1999 singles
Tim McGraw songs
Songs about New Orleans
Songs written by Keith Follesé
Song recordings produced by Byron Gallimore
Song recordings produced by Tim McGraw
Song recordings produced by James Stroud
Curb Records singles
1999 songs